Apolinar de Jesús Soto Quesada (July 23, 1827 – July 13, 1911) was a Costa Rican politician and soldier. He was born on 23 July 1827 in Alajuela, Costa Rica, to Bernardo Soto Herrera and Josefa Quesada González. He married Joaquina Alfaro Muñoz on 23 April 1849 in Alajuela, with whom he had ten children: Bernardo Soto Alfaro, President of the Republic from 1885 to 1890, and José María Soto Alfaro, presidential candidate in 1919.

He had three more children from a relationship with Mercedes Fernández Bonilla, daughter of Juan Mora Fernández's cousin: María Josefina Fernández Bonilla, Clemente Fernández Bonilla, and María Adelaida Fernández Bonilla. 

He followed a career in the army and rose to the rank of General in the Costa Rican army. A supporter of President Tomás Guardia Gutiérrez, he was a member of the Consejo de Estado (Council of State) from 1880 to 1882. Subsequently, during the terms of his son Bernardo Soto Alfaro, on whom he exercised enormous influence, he held positions of great importance. He was Second Designate to the Presidency from 1885 to 1886, First Designate to the Presidency from 1886 to 1890, and Secretary of War and Navy from 1886 to 1887 and from 1888 to 1889.

In his native city he was called Tepezcuintle. He died in Alajuela, Costa Rica, on 13 June 1911.

Vice presidents of Costa Rica
1827 births
1911 deaths
People from Alajuela